Parliamentary elections were held for the first time in Morocco on 17 May 1963. They followed the approval of a constitution in a referendum the previous year. The result was a victory for the pro-Monarchy Front for the Defence of Constitutional Institutions (FDIC), which won 69 seats. However, the two main opposition parties, the Istiqlal Party and the National Union of Popular Forces, won exactly the same number of seats. Voter turnout was 71.8%. However, in November the Supreme Court annulled the results of several seats won by the opposition. By-elections held in January 1964 gave the FDIC control of Parliament, which was eventually dissolved by King Hassan II in 1965.

Indirect elections to the House of Councillors were held on 12 October, with the FDIC winning 102 of the 120 seats.

Electoral system
The 120 members of the House of Councillors were elected by three electoral colleges; members of provincial and prefectural assemblies elected 80 members, professional bodies elected 35 members (of which industrial workers elected 14, farmers elected 16 and craftsmen elected 5) and business councils elected five.

Results

House of Representatives

House of Councillors

References

Morocco
1963 in Morocco
Elections in Morocco
May 1963 events in Africa